The 1932–33 FA Cup was the 58th season of the world's oldest football cup competition, the Football Association Challenge Cup, commonly known as the FA Cup. Everton won the competition for the second time, beating Manchester City 3–0 in the final at Wembley.

Matches were scheduled to be played at the stadium of the team named first on the date specified for each round, which was always a Saturday. Some matches, however, might be rescheduled for other days if there were clashes with games for other competitions or the weather was inclement. If scores were level after 90 minutes had been played, a replay would take place at the stadium of the second-named team later the same week. If the replayed match was drawn further replays would be held until a winner was determined. If scores were level after 90 minutes had been played in a replay, a 30-minute period of extra time would be played.

Calendar

First round proper
At this stage 43 clubs from the Football League Third Division North and South joined the 24 non-league clubs having come through the qualifying rounds, plus Third Division South club Brighton & Hove Albion (who failed to apply for exemption and played in the preliminary rounds - they would ultimately reach the Fifth Round!).  Barnsley, and Watford were given a bye to the Third Round. To make the number of matches up, non-league Marine and Dulwich Hamlet were given byes to this round. 34 matches were scheduled to be played on Saturday, 26 November 1932. Eight were drawn and went to replays in the following midweek fixture, of which one went to a second replay.

Second round proper
The matches were played on Saturday, 10 December 1932. Six matches were drawn, with replays taking place in the following midweek fixture. Of these, one game went to a second replay.

Third round proper
The 44 First and Second Division clubs entered the competition at this stage, along with Barnsley, Watford and amateur club Corinthian. The matches were scheduled for Saturday, 14 January 1933, with the exception of the Millwall–Reading game, which was played four days after. Seven matches were drawn and went to replays in the following midweek fixture.

Fourth round proper
The matches were scheduled for Saturday, 28 January 1933. Two games were drawn and went to replays in the following midweek fixture.

Fifth round proper
The matches were scheduled for Saturday, 18 February 1933. There were two replays, played in the next midweek fixture.

Sixth round proper
The four Sixth Round ties were scheduled to be played on Saturday, 4 March 1933. There was one replay, between Sunderland and Derby County, played in the following midweek fixture.

Semi-finals
The semi-final matches were played on Saturday, 18 March 1933. Manchester City and Everton won their matches to meet in the final at Wembley.

Final

The 1933 FA Cup Final was contested by Manchester City and Everton at Wembley on 29 April 1933. Everton won the game for the second time in their history, the previous time coming in 1906.

Match details

See also
FA Cup Final Results 1872-

References
General
Official site; fixtures and results service at TheFA.com
1932-33 FA Cup at rssf.com
1932-33 FA Cup at soccerbase.com

Specific

FA Cup seasons
FA
Cup